Siriano (also called "Selea" or "Sürá") are a Tucanoan people indigenous to Colombia and Brazil. Their total population is estimated at 750, with most living in Colombia. Their exogamous culture means that, glossologically, speakers are identified by the first language of their father. The Siriano language is Tucanoan.

Notes

References
Ibáñez Fonseca, Rodrigo (1972) Los Siriano. Bogotá: University of the Andes. 
Nagler, Christine, and Beverly Brandrup (1979) "Fonología del Siriano"; Sistemas fonológicos de idiomas colombianos IV: 101-126. ILV. Lomalinda: Editorial Townsend.
Ojeda, Elvira; Sussy Orozco, and Ruth Monterroso (1984) "Los Sirianos"; Ellis de Walter, Leah B. and Linda Criswell (eds.) Estudiemos las culturas indígenas de Colombia: 170-171. ILV. Lomalinda: Editorial Townsend.

Indigenous peoples of the Amazon
Indigenous peoples in Brazil
Indigenous peoples in Colombia